The following is a list of programs broadcast on True Crime Network, a television network in the United States designed for digital subchannels of broadcast television stations. The majority of the programs are crime, investigation and procedural programs sourced from Turner Entertainment, but includes content from other production companies.

Current programming

Original programming
Killing Spree (March 6, 2016–present) co-produced with TwoFour Productions
Inside the Mind of a Serial Killer (March 6, 2016–present) co-produced with Zodiak Productions

True crime programming
Alaska State Troopers (January 20, 2015–present)
Body of Evidence (January 20, 2015–present) 
Border Wars (October 26, 2015 – present)
Cold Blooded
Cold Case Files (November 27, 2015 – present) A&E 
Dominick Dunne's Power, Privilege, and Justice (January 24, 2015–present)
Extreme Evidence (January 24, 2015–present)
Forensic Factor (October 26, 2015 – present)
Haunting Evidence (January 20, 2015–present)
I, Detective (January 24, 2015–present)
The Investigators (January 20, 2015–present) 
L.A. Forensics (January 20, 2015–present)
Locked Up Abroad (January 20, 2015–present)
Masterminds (January 24, 2015–present) 
Missing Persons Unit (January 20, 2015–present)
Most Shocking (October 26, 2015 – present)
Murder by the Book (January 24, 2015–present)
The New Detectives (October 26, 2015 – present)
North Mission Road (January 25, 2015–present)
Over the Limit (January 25, 2015–present)
Parco P.I. (January 24, 2015–present)
Psychic Detectives (January 20, 2015–present)
Solved (January 18, 2015–present)

References

External links
 

True Crime Network